Sannino is an Italian surname. Notable people with the surname include:

Francesco Sannino (born 1968), Italian theoretical physicist
Giuseppe Sannino (born 1957), Italian footballer and manager
Stefano Sannino (born 1959), Italian diplomat and civil servant

Italian-language surnames